The 1961 Lehigh Engineers football team was an American football team that represented Lehigh University during the 1961 NCAA College Division football season. Despite not winning either of its two conferences, Lehigh was awarded the Lambert Cup as the best small-college football team in the East. 

In their 16th year under head coach William Leckonby, the Engineers compiled a 7–2 record. Michael Semcheski was the team captain.

In conference play, Lehigh's 3–2 record against opponents in the Middle Atlantic Conference, University Division, secured a tie with Delaware, and placed them behind Rutgers (4–0) and Bucknell (5–2). The Engineers went 1–1 against the Middle Three, losing to Rutgers and beating Lafayette.

The Engineers were a sporadic entry on the national small-college rankings. Lehigh was rated No. 9, with one first-place vote, in the October 5 AP poll, but dropped out of the top 10 the next week. The team returned to the AP rankings on November 9, at No. 8, before rising the next week to No. 6, its eventual year-end ranking. The season's first UPI coaches poll did not place Lehigh in the top 20, though the Engineers made it to No. 19 for two weeks in October before returning for good in mid-November. Following the rivalry victory over Lafayette, Lehigh climbed to a final ranking of No. 11 in the coaches poll.

In both polls, Lehigh ended up the top-ranked team in the geographic area covered by the Lambert awards. Rutgers, which defeated Lehigh and won both conferences, was considered a "major" university and not eligible for the Lambert Cup. Of the eight members of the Lambert selection committee, seven listed Lehigh as their No. 1 choice, with the eighth listing it as No. 2. As the winners of the inaugural small-college Lambert Cup in 1957, Lehigh became the first college to receive the award twice.

Lehigh played its home games at Taylor Stadium on the university campus in Bethlehem, Pennsylvania.

Schedule

References

Lehigh
Lehigh
Lehigh Mountain Hawks football seasons
Lehigh Engineers football